Thörey is a village near Ichtershausen in Ilm-Kreis, Thuringia, Germany, with about 250 inhabitants. It is part of the municipality Amt Wachsenburg.

References

Villages in Thuringia
Saxe-Coburg and Gotha
Ilm-Kreis